The Perkerson neighborhood (formerly called Perkerson Park neighborhood) is located in Southwest Atlanta, Georgia in NPU-X (Neighborhood Planning Unit). The name change was made by request of residents/members of the Perkerson Civic Association (PCA) in order to keep people from confusing the neighborhood with Perkerson Park which is the large park (49 acres) that serves the area.

Boundaries
The neighborhood is surrounded by the Downtown Connector and I-75 to the east, SR 166 to the north, the Atlanta-East Point city limits to the west, and Cleveland Avenue to the south.

History
The area that now encompasses the Perkerson neighborhood was originally owned by Jeremiah S. Gilbert (a farmer) who purchased the land from his father, the first doctor in Fulton County. Mr. Gilbert was married to Mathilda Perkerson, the daughter of Thomas Jefferson Perkerson  who was the second sheriff of Fulton County who was from another pioneer family of Fulton County. The Perkerson neighborhood developed out of the land of Thomas J. Perkerson and Jeremiah S. Gilbert who bought  from his father's holdings. The land was not developed fully until the 1950s.

Thomas J. Perkerson settled in Land Lots 103 and 104 (Perkerson Park and Sylvan Hills) with his family in the mid-1830s. His home stood for well over a hundred years on Perkerson Road (Old Rough and Ready Road) before its demolition for construction of a grocery store.

Thomas Perkerson was the second sheriff of Fulton County as well as one of its most notable citizens. His land was subdivided into Perkerson Park and Sylvan Hills in 1944 after the death of Lizzie Perkerson Butler, who was the last family member to live in the old house which had survived General Sherman's burning of Atlanta because the family refused to leave the house as Matilda Perkerson Gilbert was too sick to be moved.

The slum Plunkett Town was located at the southern edge of what is now Perkerson, around the current location of the I-75 Cleveland Avenue interchange.

Neighboring communities in NPU-X
(Capitol View and Sylvan Hills) to the north, but they are at least a mile apart.
Hammond Park is located on the south side of Cleveland Avenue and extends down to the East Point city limits.

Great urban renewal story
The Perkerson neighborhood is currently recovering from a serious decline. One of the major roads in the neighborhood, Metropolitan Pkwy., was once the site of the earliest family vacation motels and trailer parks for vacationers who traveled along Highway 19/41 (The Old Dixie Highway) from the northern states to Florida with the advent of the automobile and theme parks around the country. Metropolitan Parkway was the site of the earliest automotive dealerships as well, and the strip became known for the new car dealerships that sold Chevrolet and Ford vehicles. As the U.S. Interstate highway system was built, then Highway 19/41 saw a decline in traffic, and Metropolitan Parkway became the site of strip clubs and motels catering to the sex trade which caused prostitution, robberies and murders to increase. Thankfully, many of the old motels are no longer in the sex trade business with most having been demolished.

Housing

Places of interest
 Jeremiah S. Gilbert House at Avery Park and the Jeremiah S. Gilbert State Memorial Site
Roseland Cemetery

Education
Perkerson residents are zoned to schools in the Atlanta Public Schools.

Elementary schools
 Perkerson Elementary School (for students who live north of Pegg Road)
 Emma Hutchinson Elementary School (for students who live south of Pegg Road)

Middle schools
 Sylvan Hills Middle School
 Crawford W. Long Middle School

High schools
South Atlanta High School
 School of Engineering
 School of Health & Medical Science
 School of Law & Government
 School of Leadership & Economics

Neighborhoods in Atlanta